Julius Murgor is a Kenyan politician. He belongs to the United Democratic Alliance and was elected to represent the Kapenguria Constituency in the National Assembly of Kenya since the 2007 Kenyan parliamentary election.

In 2022 Kenyan general elections, he was elected 3rd Senator for West Pokot County.

References
 Members Of The 10th Parliament . Parliament of Kenya. Accessed June 19, 2008.</ref>

Members of the National Assembly (Kenya)
Living people
Year of birth missing (living people)
Orange Democratic Movement politicians